Buzzy Boop (originally untitled) is a 1938 Fleischer Studios animated short film in the Max Fleischer/Betty Boop Cartoon featuring Betty Boop and her young tomboy cousin Buzzy Boop.

Plot
Betty Boop's tomboyish young cousin, Buzzy, takes the train to visit Betty. While riding the train, she is "helpful" to other passengers in a mischievous kind of way. She uses her chewing gum to stick on a sleeping man's toupee, and waters the flowers in a lady's hat.

At Betty's house, Buzzy meets up with a bunch of rough boys next door, who are playing marbles. She tries to join in. She proves better than the boys at tricks like balancing on a fence, and even fares well when the boys unleash a goat to fight with her. Only then is she considered "one of the guys!"

Notes
Buzzy Boop makes another appearance in Buzzy Boop at the Concert. For many years, the cartoon was lost. Buzzy Boop at the Concert was discovered in Moscow and was repatriated and restored by the UCLA Film & Television Archives in 2019, with the support of ASIFA-Hollywood.

References

External links

1938 animated films
Betty Boop cartoons
1930s American animated films
American black-and-white films
Paramount Pictures short films
1938 short films
Fleischer Studios short films
Short films directed by Dave Fleischer
1930s English-language films
American comedy short films
American animated short films